The Daihatsu V series (Japanese: ダイハツ・Vシリーズ) is a series of cab over trucks, manufactured from 1958 to 1970. The V series was Daihatsu first four-wheeled vehicle since the Hatsudoki FA truck in 1937 (Daihatsu's former company name). The V series' main rivals in the medium-weight four-wheel truck segment were Toyota Dyna, Nissan Caball, Isuzu Elf, Prince Homer and Mazda D-Series.

The first Daihatsu V series truck was known as the Daihatsu Vesta. This 2-ton class truck was released in 1958, competing in the same weight class as Daihatsu's own RKO three-wheeler truck. The engine was a  1.5 L v-twin engine shared with the Daihatsu RKO. In 1960, the engine was replaced with a new  1.5 L FA inline-four engine and renamed to Daihatsu V200.

In 1964, a smaller 1.25-ton class was added with the 1.5 L FA engine, known as Daihatsu V100. This was followed by the 3-ton class Daihatsu V300 with the  2.4 L FD petrol engine and the Daihatsu D300 with the  2.5 L DG diesel engine.

In 1968, two new models were available, 1-ton and 1.5-ton class. This new 1-ton model also used the V100 name as did the 1.25-tonner, which caused some confusion in the market. The 1.5-ton was known as Daihatsu V150 and was also powered by the 1.5 L FA engine.

There was also medium-sized bus series based from V series truck chassis, known as the Daihatsu Light Bus.

In October 1970, as a result of the business agreement with Toyota in 1967, the V series was replaced by the Toyota Dyna-based Daihatsu Delta.

References

Daihatsu vehicles 
Cab over vehicles